Kalka Assembly constituency is one of the 90 assembly seats of Haryana, India. Kalka  is a part of Panchkula district.

Members of Legislative Assembly

★By Poll

Election Results

2019

2014

References

External links 

 Kalka

Assembly constituencies of Haryana
Panchkula district